Jesper Kristiansen may refer to:
 Jesper Kristiansen (speedway rider), Danish speedway rider
 Jesper Thusgård Kristiansen, Danish rower